St George's Channel is a sea channel connecting the Irish Sea to the north and the Celtic Sea to the southwest.

Historically, the name "St George's Channel" was used interchangeably with "Irish Sea" or "Irish Channel" to encompass all the waters between Ireland to the west and Wales to the east. Some geographers restricted it to the portion separating Wales from Leinster, sometimes extending south to the waters between the West Country of England and East Munster; the latter have since the 1970s come to be called the Celtic Sea. In Ireland "St George's Channel" is now usually taken to refer only to the narrowest part of the channel, between Carnsore Point in Wexford and St David's Head in Pembrokeshire. However, it remains common in Ireland to talk about a cross-channel trip, cross-channel soccer, etc., where "cross-channel" means "to/from Great Britain".

The current (third, 1953) edition of the International Hydrographic Organization's publication Limits of Oceans and Seas defines the southern limit of "Irish Sea and St. George's Channel" as "A line joining St. David's Head to Carnsore Point"; it does not define the two waterbodies separately. The 2002 draft fourth edition omits the "and St. George's Channel" part of the label.

A 2004 letter from the St.George's Channel Shipping Company to Seascapes, an RTÉ Radio programme, said that St George's Channel bordered the Irish coast between Howth Head and Kilmore Quay, and criticised contributors to the programme who had used "Irish Sea" for these waters.

The name "St George's Channel" is recorded in 1578 in Martin Frobisher's record of his second voyage. It is said to derive from a legend that Saint George had voyaged to Roman Britain from the Byzantine Empire, approaching Britain via the channel that bears his name. The name was popularised by English settlers in Ireland after the Plantations.

See also
 Nicobar Islands; the channel between Little Nicobar and Great Nicobar is also called St George's Channel
 North Channel (Great Britain and Ireland)
 Straits of Moyle

References

Bodies of water of the Irish Sea
Channels of Wales
Channels of Ireland
Republic of Ireland–United Kingdom border
International straits
Straits of the British Isles
Bodies of water of the Republic of Ireland
Channels of Europe